The An-Nur Jamek Mosque or Masjid Jamek An-Nur (or sometimes called Masjid Negeri Wilayah Persekutuan Labuan or  State Federal Territory of Labuan Mosque) is a mosque in the Federal Territory of Labuan, Malaysia.

History
The initial stage of construction of this mosque was run by Sabah State Government through the Sabah Islamic Religious Council (MUIS). The mosque was built to replace the old mosque nearby. It was constructed on 1982 and completed on 1987. The mosque was opened on 1 February 1988 by the eighth Yang di-Pertuan Agong, Sultan Iskandar of Johor in conjunction with the 14th Federal Territory Day.

Architecture
The architectural design was by Arkitek Jurubina Bertiga led by Dato Baharuddin Abu Kassim. The combination architecture are from Brunei Malay architectural elements mix with the Turkish architecture. As a result of these two influences has produced a new mosque has a unique identity and beautiful. The mosque is equipped with a dome-shaped dome and two tall towers on both sides of the mosque and also equipped with a number of facilities and equipment for public use such as three lecture halls, Darul Hikmah Library, administrative offices and a break room for VIPs.

See also
 Islam in Malaysia

References

Mosques in Labuan
Mosques completed in 1987
1987 establishments in Malaysia
Mosque buildings with domes